Think is the act of creating a thought.

Think or Thinks may also refer to:

Business
 Think (IBM), a slogan used by Thomas J. Watson
 The Think Global electric vehicle
 Think tank, a nickname for an organization that performs research and advocacy
 THINK Team, group of architects, planners and engineers that designed a plan for the redevelopment of the World Trade Center

Education
 THINK Together, a non-profit organization providing education support to students

Literature
 Think, a book by Michael R. LeGault
 Think: A Compelling Introduction to Philosophy, by Simon Blackburn
 "Think!" (short story), a 1977 short story by Isaac Asimov
Thinks, a play by Keith Waterhouse
Thinks ..., a novel by David Lodge

Music
 Think (band), a 1970s musical group best known for the 1971 hit "Once You Understand"

Albums
 Think! (James Brown album), 1960
 Think! (Lonnie Smith album), 1968

Songs
 "Think" (The "5" Royales song), 1957, later covered by James Brown in 1960 and 1973
 "Think" (Aretha Franklin song), 1968
 "Think" (Brenda Lee song), 1964
 "Think" (Information Society song), 1990
 "Think" (Rolling Stones song), 1965
 "Think (About It)", a 1972 song recorded by Lyn Collins
 "Think!" (theme song), a theme song from the game show Jeopardy!
 "Think", a song by The Screaming Jets from their 1992 album Tear of Thought
 "Think", a song by Booker T. & the M.G.'s from their 1966 album And Now!
 "Think", a song by Puddle of Mudd from their 2003 album Life on Display
"Think", by Toya from her 2001 self-titled album, Toya

Other media
 (Th)ink, a weekly editorial cartoon by Keith Knight
 Think (journal), an academic journal
 Think, a public talk radio program produced by KERA FM.

See also
 Thinking (poem), a poem by Walter D. Wintle
 Think tank (disambiguation), other uses of the term Think Tank